Live at Shepherd's Bush, London is a DVD by the Swedish hard rock band Europe. The main feature is a concert filmed at the O2 Shepherd's Bush Empire in London, England on 19 February 2011. It was released on DVD and Blu-ray on 15 June 2011.

Both the DVD and Blu-ray editions includes an extra CD that includes the same concert, except for three songs due to time constraints.

Track listing
 "Last Look at Eden"
 "The Beast"
 "Rock the Night"
 "Scream of Anger"
 "No Stone Unturned"
 "Carrie"
 "The Getaway Plan"
 Guitar Feature: "The Loner" (tribute to Gary Moore)
 "Seventh Sign"
 "New Love in Town"
 "Love is Not the Enemy"
 "More Than Meets the Eye"
 Drum Feature: William Tell Overture
 "Always the Pretenders"
 "Start from the Dark"
 "Superstitious"
 "Doghouse"
 "The Final Countdown"

Bonus features

DVD & Blu-Ray
Live photo gallery
Live footage from Stockholm ice stadium "Hovet" 28 December 2009:
"Prelude/Last Look at Eden"
"Love is Not the Enemy"
"Superstitious"
"Gonna Get Ready"
"Scream of Anger"
"No Stone Unturned"
"Carrie" (on Blu-ray only)
"Start From The Dark" (on Blu-ray only)
"New Love in Town"
"Let The Good Times Rock" (on Blu-ray only)
"Cherokee" (on Blu-ray only)
"The Beast"
"Seven Doors Hotel" (on Blu-ray only)
Live footage from Gröna Lund in Stockholm 17 September 2010:
"Last Look at Eden"
Guitar Feature
"Seventh Sign"
"Start from the Dark"
Live photo gallery
Documentary: interviews and rehearsals (on Blu-ray only)
Music videos:
"Last Look at Eden"
"New Love in Town"

Extra live CD
 "Prelude"
 "Last Look at Eden"
 "The Beast"
 "Rock the Night"
 "Scream of Anger"
 "No Stone Unturned"
 "Carrie"
 "The Getaway Plan"
 "Seventh Sign"
 "New Love in Town"
 "Love is Not the Enemy"
 "More Than Meets the Eye"
 "Always the Pretenders"
 "Start from the Dark"
 "Superstitious"
 "The Final Countdown"

Personnel
Joey Tempest – lead vocals, rhythm & acoustic guitars
John Norum – lead & rhythm guitars, backing vocals
John Levén – bass guitar
Mic Michaeli – keyboards, backing vocals
Ian Haugland – drums, backing vocals

Europe (band) video albums
Live video albums
2011 video albums
Shepherd's Bush
2010s English-language films